According to the ACL, property sellers and agents must disclose any defects in a property, which a buyer is planning to buy. Lying by omission would lead to breach of contract. This law does not mean that the property dealer guarantees the good title of the property but that he/she has not done anything, or is not aware of anything, which would make their title defective. Each Australian state and territory has modified this common law differently.

Table 
This table shows that the law varies from state to state. The data have been updated to 2017.

Criticism 
In 2006 Queensland industry experts expressed the view supporting a universal Vendor Disclosure Statement for Australia that presents information "in such a way as to unambiguous, clear, and concise and which is known to the vendor or which should be known". They were convinced that "smarter disclosure, focussing on identifying the product attributes" will improve the real estate industry's standards and image. Experts believed that "there should be an executive summary or checklist of disclosure requirements", since few buyers had read/understand current (at that time) disclosure legislation, which was characterized by complex "legalese" language. That means experts calling for "additional, yet smarter and user-friendly disclosure which focuses on outlining a property's attributes".

References

Further reading 
 

Real property law
Consumer protection in Australia